"I Could Not Ask for More" is a song composed by American songwriter Diane Warren and originally recorded and released in February 1999, by American singer-songwriter Edwin McCain for the original soundtrack of the 1999 romantic drama film Message in a Bottle, starring Kevin Costner, Robin Wright Penn and Paul Newman. It was also on his third studio album Messenger (1999) and became a Billboard-charted top 40 single in the summer of 1999.

In 2001, American country music artist Sara Evans popularly covered the song on her third studio album Born to Fly (2000). Her rendition was released as the album's second single and peaked at number 2 on the US Billboard Hot Country Songs chart.

Music video
The music video features McCain walking and taking a taxi through a busy city decorated like a 19th century village with people in 19th century costumes. While McCain is traveling, a number of people are sitting in a park tree. He reaches the tree just as a branch a woman is sitting on breaks and manages to catch her as she falls.

Chart performance

Weekly charts

Year-end charts

Sara Evans cover

American country music singer Sara Evans' cover version of the song was released in February 2001 as the second single from her 2000 album Born to Fly. Evans' version was a Top 5 hit on the country music charts.

Music video
The music video for Evans' rendition was directed by Peter Zavadil, and features shots of her on location in White Sands National Monument in New Mexico singing the song in different outfits and frequently sitting in different chairs throughout the video.

Chart performance
"I Could Not Ask for More" debuted at number 52 on the U.S. Billboard Hot Country Singles & Tracks chart for the week of February 17, 2001. It soon reached number 2 on that chart.

Year-end charts

References

 

1990s ballads
1999 songs
1999 singles
2001 singles
Edwin McCain songs
Sara Evans songs
Songs written by Diane Warren
Music videos directed by Peter Zavadil
Song recordings produced by Matt Serletic
Rock ballads
Country ballads
Song recordings produced by Paul Worley
Atlantic Records singles
RCA Records Nashville singles